Hideo Tanaka may refer to:

Hideo Tanaka (runner) (born 1909), Japanese Olympic athlete
Hideo Tanaka (director) (1933–2011), Japanese film director
Hideo Tanaka (footballer) (born 1983), Japanese football player